State Highway 30 (Andhra Pradesh) is a state highway in Anantapur district of the Indian state of Andhra Pradesh

Route 

It starts at Anantapur and passes through Tadipatri, before terminating at Bugga.

Junctions and interchanges

See also 
 List of State Highways in Andhra Pradesh

References 

State Highways in Andhra Pradesh
Roads in Anantapur district